Vennesla is a municipality in Agder county, Norway. It is located in the traditional district of Sørlandet. The administrative centre of the municipality is the village of Vennesla. Other villages in Vennesla include Grovane, Hægeland, Homstean, Mushom, Øvre Eikeland, Øvrebø, Røyknes, and Skarpengland.

The  municipality is the 242nd largest by area out of the 356 municipalities in Norway. Vennesla is the 78th most populous municipality in Norway with a population of 15,123.

General information

The parish of Vennesla was established as a municipality in 1864 when it was separated from the larger municipality of Øvrebø. Initially, Vennesla had 1,103 residents. During the 1960s, there were many municipal mergers across Norway due to the work of the Schei Committee. On 1 January 1964, Vennesla (population: 7,321) was merged with most of the neighboring municipality of Øvrebø (population: 925) and with all of another neighboring municipality, Hægeland (population: 849) which created a new, much larger municipality of Vennesla. On 1 January 1978, a small area of Vennesla (population: 10) was transferred to neighboring Songdalen municipality. Then again on 1 January 1984, the unpopulated Hauglandsvatnet area was transferred from Vennesla to Songdalen municipality. On 1 January 1990, the unpopulated Røssebrekka area, just east of the village of Vennesla was transferred from Kristiansand municipality to Vennesla.

Name
The municipality (originally the parish) is named after the old Vennesla farm, since the first Vennesla Church was built there. The first element is the genitive case of vendill which means "small twig" (maybe used as a name of an arm of Venneslafjorden) and the last element is lá which means "swamp".

Coat of arms
The coat of arms was granted on 15 May 1971. The arms have a red background. There are three wavy lines diagonally crossing the arms which symbolises the river Otra, which runs through the municipality. Above the lines are golden outlines of six trees which symbolize the importance of forestry to the local economy. Below the river are two gold colored cogwheels which symbolize the local industry. There is a three-pointed crown on top of the arms which represent the three municipalities that were merged in 1964 to form the present municipality: Vennesla, Øvrebø, and Hægeland.

Churches
The Church of Norway has three parishes within the municipality of Vennesla. It is part of the Otredal deanery in the Diocese of Agder og Telemark.

Government
All municipalities in Norway, including Vennesla, are responsible for primary education (through 10th grade), outpatient health services, senior citizen services, unemployment and other social services, zoning, economic development, and municipal roads. The municipality is governed by a municipal council of elected representatives, which in turn elect a mayor.  The municipality falls under the Agder District Court and the Agder Court of Appeal.

Municipal council
The municipal council of Vennesla is made up of 27 representatives that are elected to four year terms. Currently, the party breakdown is as follows:

Geography
The neighboring municipalities are Evje og Hornnes (to the north), Birkenes and Iveland (to the east), and Kristiansand (to the south and west), and Lindesnes (to the west).

The river Otra runs through the municipality from north to south. Both of the lakes Kilefjorden and Venneslafjorden are located along the river. The river Songdalselva runs through the western part of the municipality.

Climate

Economy
Vennesla (mostly the village of Vennesla) has a small industrial base, primarily with Hunsfos Fabrikker AS, a paper mill, as the cornerstone of the community. During recent decades, however, the number of employees has drastically declined from around 1,200 in the 1970s, to 200 in 2005 and 120 in 2007. In 2010 there was only 135 employees at the paper mill. 
In 2011, Hunsfos Fabrikker AS celebrated 125 years as a paper mill.

During Q4 2022, "one hundred plus" workers at Huntonit, a cornerstone of the community, were scheduled for a temporary Layoff (from work); that's a large part of the company's work force; there is no fixed schedule for returning to work.

Media
The newspaper Vennesla Tidende has been published in Vennesla since 1989.

Attractions

Vikeland Hovedgård

Vikeland Hovedgård is a manor house located along the Otra River in the village of Vennesla. Vigeland Manor was completed in 1847. The building was constructed of wood in both Empire and Swiss style. It was built as part of Vigeland Brug, then one of the largest sawmills in the area. Vigeland Manor was built by Caspar Wild who bought the farm and adjacent sawmill in 1833. In 1894, the farm was sold to John Clarke Hawkshaw whose family retained the manor until around 1960. The current annex was built around 1900. During the 1980s, there was restoration with the main building subsequently used as lodging, corporate, and meeting facilities.

The manor house has been said to be haunted by a ghost known as "the Blue Lady" (den Blå Dama). Mari was a farm worker who fell in love with the owner's son. They were not allowed to marry, so it is said Mari committed suicide in the "blue room", hence the title "the Blue Lady".

Vennesla Church

Vennesla Church (Vennesla Kirke) serves Vennesla parish in Otredal deanery (Otredal prosti). The church was completed in 1829 and consecrated the following year. The church was built of stone and brick, while the west tower with side buildings are wooden. The church replaced a church from the first half of the 1600s. The tower was made higher in 1886, and the interior was restored in 1925.

Vindbjart Football Club
The football club of Vennesla is Vindbjart FK, founded in 1896. Vindbjart is currently playing in the Norwegian Second Division and the stadium is Moseidmoen gress in the village of Vennesla.

Notable residents

 Gabriel Moseid (1882 in Vennesla – 1961) a politician, Mayor of Vennesla, 1922
 Ole Jørgensen (1897–1966) a Norwegian politician, Mayor of Vennesla, 1940's & 1950's 
 Sigurd Aalefjær (1917–1991) engineer and director of hydropower plants, grew up in Vennesla
 Engly Lie (1919 in Vennesla - 2001) a carpenter and politician, Mayor of Vennesla, 1959
 Børre Knudsen (1937 in Vennesla - 2014) a Lutheran priest and anti-abortion activist 
 Kristen Gislefoss (born 1954 in Vennesla) a meteorologist, prime time weather presenter for NRK 
 Kjetil Nordhus (born 1975 in Vennesla) a Norwegian singer, composer and music producer
 Jorun Stiansen (born 1984) a Norwegian pop singer and artist, grew up in Vennesla
 Maria Arredondo (born 1985 in Vennesla) a pop singer

Twin towns – sister cities

Vennesla is twinned with:
 Katrineholm, Sweden
 Odder, Denmark
 Salo, Finland

See also
Vennesla Library and Culture House

References

External links

Municipal fact sheet from Statistics Norway 
Welcome to Vennesla - Tourist information
Vigeland Hovedgård

 
Kristiansand region
Municipalities of Agder
1864 establishments in Norway